Seberang Tengah was a federal constituency in Penang, Malaysia, that was represented in the Dewan Rakyat from 1959 to 1974.

The federal constituency was created from parts of the Wellesley North constituency in the 1958 redistribution and was mandated to return a single member to the Dewan Rakyat under the first past the post voting system. Its last election was in 1969. It disappeared in the 1974 election and was split into Bukit Mertajam and Permatang Pauh.

History
It was abolished in 1974 when it was redistributed.

Representation history

State constituency

Election results

References

Defunct Penang federal constituencies